The Best of Spineshank is a greatest hits compilation album, released by the American industrial metal band Spineshank's former record label Roadrunner Records. It was released on January 29, 2008 and features material from the band's first 3 studio albums presented in reverse chronological order. The album has sold over 10,000 copies as of March 11, 2008.

Track listing
 "Violent Mood Swings" - 3:29
 "Smothered" - 3:07
 "Stillborn" - 4:15
 "Dead to Me" - 3:34
 "Asthmatic" - 3:30
 "The Height of Callousness" - 3:04
 "New Disease" - 3:14
 "Synthetic" - 3:09
 "Cyanide 2600" - 3:10
 "Detached" - 3:21
 "Where We Fall" - 3:30
 "Shinebox" - 3:07

Tracks 10-12 are from the album Strictly Diesel (1998)
Tracks 5-9 are from the album The Height of Callousness (2000)
Tracks 1-4 are from the album Self-Destructive Pattern (2003)

Personnel

Musicians
 Jonny Santos – vocals
 Mike Sarkisyan – guitar, co-producer
 Robert Garcia – bass, backing vocals
 Tommy Decker – drums, programming

Credits
 GGGarth – Producer
 Ted Jensen – Mastering
 Frank Gryner – Engineering, Recording, Additional programming
 Scott Humphrey – Engineering, Recording, Additional programming
 Jay Baumgardner – Mixing
 Mark Kiczula – Assistant mixer
 Ben "Game Over" Kaplan – Digital editing
 Jeff Rothschild – Assistant digital editor
 Anthony "Fu" Valcic – Assistant digital editor
 Brad Kane – Additional Vocals

References

Spineshank albums
2008 greatest hits albums
Roadrunner Records compilation albums